NGC 319 is a spiral galaxy in the constellation Phoenix. It was first discovered on September 5, 1834 by John Herschel.

References

Galaxies discovered in 1834
0319
18340905
Phoenix (constellation)
Intermediate spiral galaxies
003398